Running Man (Chinese: 逃婚100次) is a 2017 Taiwanese series starring Alien Huang, Lee Chien-na, Na Dow and Chang Chin-lan. Filming began on 14 May 2017.

Cast

Main cast

Broadcast information

References

2017 Taiwanese television series debuts
2017 Taiwanese television series endings
Taiwanese drama television series